William Jewell (born July 14, 1941) is an American sprint canoer who competed in the mid-1960s. He was eliminated in the repechages of the K-4 1000 m event at the 1964 Summer Olympics in Tokyo.

References
Sports-reference.com profile

1941 births
American male canoeists
Canoeists at the 1964 Summer Olympics
Living people
Olympic canoeists of the United States